Sir Pato Kakaraya, KBE, CMG, is a Papua New Guinea politician and former Cabinet Minister. Kakaraya was the second person considered for the elections for Governor-General of Papua New Guinea in 2004. Despite Sir Paulias Matane's win, Kakaraya disputed the vote. He ran again in 2011 but lost 65-23 to Michael Ogio.

Kakaraya only had a grade 6 education, but he later attended the Lutheran Mission as a youth leader (1958-1966) and later as translator (1966-1967).

He was advisor at Waso Limited from 1967-1971, then joined the Wabag Native Trading Company from 1971-1972.

He was elected as a member of the National Parliament for the Wapenamanda Open Seat from 1972-1987.

Kakaraya held ministerial posts including:

 Minister for Environment and Conservation 1978-1980
 Minister for Youth, Recreation and Women Affairs 1977-1978
 Minister for Works and Implementation 1981-1985

References

 Environment office must be upgraded: Sir Pato

Year of birth missing (living people)
Living people
Members of the National Parliament of Papua New Guinea
People from Enga Province
Government ministers of Papua New Guinea
Papua New Guinean knights
Papua New Guinean Knights Commander of the Order of the British Empire
Papua New Guinean Commanders of the Order of St Michael and St George